Nollaig is a unisex given name in Irish-speaking countries. Originating from the Latin for Christmas, it is the equivalent to English Noel or Noelle.

People named Nollaig

Female
 Nollaig Casey, Irish fiddle player
 Nollaig Cleary (born 1981), Irish Gaelic football player

Male

 Nollaig Ó Muraíle, Irish scholar
 Nollaig Ó Gadhra (1943–2008), Irish language activist
 Noel 'Nollaig' Bridgeman (1946-2021), Irish musician

References

External links

Irish unisex given names
Given names